The 1935 Catholic University Cardinals football team represented the Catholic University of America during the 1935 college football season. The Cardinals were led by Dutch Bergman, compiled an 8–1 record, shut out three opponents, and outscored their opponents by a total of 140 to 53. The Cardinals were invited to the Orange Bowl, their first of two major bowl games, where they defeated Ole Miss, 20–19.

Schedule

Freshman team schedule

References

Catholic University
Catholic University Cardinals football seasons
Orange Bowl champion seasons
Catholic University Cardinals football